Mount Dobrynin is a mountain,  high, standing  east-southeast of Eidsgavlen Cliff on the east side of the Humboldt Mountains in Queen Maud Land, Antarctica. It was discovered and plotted from air photos by the Third German Antarctic Expedition, 1938–39. It was mapped from air photos and surveys by the Sixth Norwegian Antarctic Expedition, 1956–60; remapped by the Soviet Antarctic Expedition, 1960–61, and named after the Soviet geographer B.F. Dobrynin.

References 

Mountains of Queen Maud Land
Humboldt Mountains (Antarctica)